Albert Andrew Riederer (September 30, 1945 – December 27, 2012) was an American jurist and politician.

Riederer graduated from St. Louis University and New York University Law School. He served as a judge of the Missouri Court of Appeals 1997–1999. He was a prosecutor and a Jackson County, Missouri county legislator.

References

External links

1945 births
2012 deaths
Saint Louis University alumni
New York University School of Law alumni
Missouri Court of Appeals judges
People from Kansas City, Missouri
20th-century American judges